Clacton Carriage Servicing Depot is a stabling point located in Clacton-on-Sea, Essex, England. The depot is situated on the western side of the Great Eastern Main Line and is adjacent to  Clacton-on-Sea station.

The depot code is CC.

History
Opened by British Rail in 1981, the depot was built with a three-road dead-end shed. Around 1987, the depot had an allocation of Classes 302, 308, 309, 312 and 313 EMUs. The depot lost its allocation of rolling stock in 1994, and was put to various uses before being scheduled for reopening around 2009.

Present 
As of 2021, stabling is provided for Greater Anglia Class 321 EMUs. The depot currently carries out cleaning and the servicing for the trains, during the night.

In 2020, as part of Greater Anglia's rolling stock update strategy, a train lifting system was introduced so that trains could be lifted up from the depot floor. The previous system could lift a 4 car EMU but has now been upgraded so that they could lift a Class 755 BMU.

References

Bibliography

Rail transport in Essex
Railway depots in England